The 2014 Foster Farms Bowl was an American college football bowl game that was played on December 30, 2014, at Levi's Stadium in Santa Clara, California. It was one of the 2014–15 bowl games that concluded the 2014 FBS football season. The 13th edition of the Foster Farms Bowl (previously known as the Fight Hunger Bowl), it featured the Stanford Cardinal from the Pac-12 Conference against the Maryland Terrapins from the Big Ten Conference.  The game began at 7:00 p.m. PST and aired on ESPN/ESPN Radio.  It was sponsored by the Foster Farms poultry company. Stanford won the game by a final score of 45–21.

Teams
The game represented the first overall meeting between these two teams.

Maryland

Stanford

Game summary

Scoring summary

Source:

Statistics

References

External links
 Game summary at ESPN

Foster Farms Bowl
Redbox Bowl
Maryland Terrapins football bowl games
Stanford Cardinal football bowl games
Foster Farms Bowl
Foster Farms Bowl